54 Aurigae is a multiple star system located around  away from the Sun in the northern constellation of Auriga. It is visible to the naked eye as a dim, blue-white hued star with a combined apparent visual magnitude of 6.02. The system is moving further from the Sun with a heliocentric radial velocity of around +19 km/s. 

The double was discovered in 1843 when the separation was only . There is no separate measure of the parallax of the secondary, but it shares a common proper motion with the brighter star and they are assumed to form a binary. The spectral class B7 III is assigned to the brighter of the pair, indicating a hot giant star, although it has also been given as B7/8 III/V, suggesting it may be a main sequence star. Most sources can't give a separate spectral classification for the fainter star, but it has been listed as DA1/K4V, indicating it is either a white dwarf or red dwarf.

The brighter component of the visible pair is an eclipsing binary with a period of 1.8797 days, and a primary eclipse depth of 0.03 magnitudes.

References

B-type giants
Suspected variables
Binary stars
Auriga (constellation)
Durchmusterung objects
Aurigae, 54
047395
031852
2438